Troitsky Administrative Okrug is one of the twelve administrative okrugs of Moscow. The okrug was founded on July 1, 2012.

Territorial organisation
At the time of formation it included the following settlements, which previously belonged to Naro-Fominsky and Podolsky Districts, as well as Troitsk Town of Oblast Significance, all of Moscow Oblast,

 Troitsk Settlement;
 Kiyevsky Settlement;
 Klenovskoye Settlement;
 Krasnopakhorskoye Settlement;
 Mikhaylovo-Yartsevskoye Settlement;
 Novofyodorovskoye Settlement;
 Pervomayskoye Settlement;
 Rogovskoye Settlement;
 Shchapovskoye Settlement;
 Voronovskoye Settlement.

References

External links
 

 
Administrative okrugs of Moscow